Yezda Urfa was an American progressive rock band founded in the fall of 1973. The band recorded two albums before breaking up in the spring of 1981. The band's music is currently distributed by Syn-Phonic.

The name 
The name Yezda Urfa comes from Yazd, Iran and Urfa, Turkey. The band came across these names while leafing through the dictionary, looking for a band name. Yazd was changed to Yezda to ease pronunciation. In the Russian language "yezda" (ездá) is a noun meaning a "ride" or "drive", however this is apparently incidental.

The sound 
Described as a blend of Yes and Gentle Giant, Yezda Urfa was known for playing high-energy progressive rock. Break-neck tempos, changing time signatures, and diverse instrumentation were hallmarks of their sound.

Members 
The original members:

Rick Rodenbaugh – vocals
 Phil Kimbrough – keyboards, mandolin, wind, vocals
 Mark Tippins – guitar, vocals
 Marc Miller – bass, cello, marimba, vibes, vocals
 Brad Christoff – drums, percussion

Members during the live concert:

Ronnie Platt — vocals
Michael Barry — keyboards
Mark Tippins — guitar, vocals
Marc Miller — bass, vocals
Brad Christoff — drums, percussion

Discography 
 Boris - Demo album 1975 (CD re-releases 2004, 2009, 2010 & 2012)
 Sacred Baboon (recorded 1976, released 1989) CD re-releases 1992 & 2010) 
 YEZDAURFALIVE - NEARfest 2004 (2010) CD and MP3 release recorded live at NEARfest 2004

References

External links 
 Band's website: www.yezdaurfa.com
 Ground and Sky Review
 Yezda Urfa biography, discography and album reviews, credits & releases at AllMusic
 Yezda Urfa discography, album releases & credits at Discogs.com
 Yezda Urfa albums to be listened as stream at Spotify.com

American progressive rock groups